The Anointed Quorum, also known as the Quorum of the Anointed, or the Holy Order, was a select body of men and women who Joseph Smith initiated into Mormon temple ordinances at Nauvoo, Illinois, which gave them special standing in the early Latter Day Saint movement.  Beginning in May 1842, Smith gave this group, which ultimately numbered over sixty persons, their washings and anointings and endowments in the upper floor of his Red Brick Store on Water Street, as well as in a few private residences in the city. Most couples, but not all, also received their Second Anointing. Members typically referred to their meetings, which were held usually every two weeks, as prayer circles, because prayer played an important role in the group's religious activities.

Nearly all members of the Anointed Quorum were important leaders and their wives in the church or community, including the First Presidency and Quorum of the Twelve Apostles.  After Smith's death in June 1844, members of the Anointed Quorum continued to meet under the direction of Brigham Young, even admitting additional persons to the group. As the Nauvoo Temple neared completion during 1845, they prepared the building's upper floor for the administration of ordinances. Between December 1845 and February 1846, the Anointed Quorum extended the same rituals they had received from Smith to over 5,000 men and women living in the vicinity of Nauvoo.

After the Mormons left Nauvoo in 1846, the Anointed Quorum ceased to exist as an organized group. Apparently Smith organized the group to prepare the way for the general church membership to receive their temple ordinances in the Nauvoo Temple. Once this was done, the need for the group expired. The Anointed Quorum dealt essentially with spiritual and sacerdotal matters, but it was never an official administrative body of the church.

Members
The following individuals were members of the Anointed Quorum (spouses are listed together and plural marriage relationships are indicated):

See also

Council of Fifty
Council of Friends

References

.
.

External links

1842 establishments in Illinois
1846 disestablishments
Church of Christ (Latter Day Saints)
Defunct Latter Day Saint organizations
History of the Latter Day Saint movement
Latter Day Saint hierarchy
Religious organizations established in 1842